Kipling Sahib is a biography of Rudyard Kipling, by Charles Allen. It focuses primarily on Kipling's upbringing in India, and largely ignores his later life and work.

References

Biographies about writers
2008 non-fiction books
Rudyard Kipling